Horace Luke (Chinese name: 陸學森) is a Taiwanese entrepreneur and businessman, currently the Co-Founder and CEO of Gogoro, an electric scooter and battery swapping company.

Early life and education 
Lu Xuesen was born in Hong Kong and moved to Washington at age 13. Luke attended the University of Washington, studying industrial design.

Career 
In 1997, he joined Microsoft and contributed to the creation of the original Xbox, and then served as the creative director of Microsoft's mobile platform product group. Luke served as the Chief Innovation Officer at HTC until  July 2011. In the same year, he founded Gogoro in Taiwan with Matt Taylor..

References 

Living people
1970 births
University of Washington alumni
Taiwanese chief executives
Company founders